

The Adam Keeling House is a historic house in Virginia Beach, Virginia, United States.

Dendrochronology undertaken by the Oxford Tree-Ring Laboratory revealed that house was constructed of timbers felled in 1734–1735, pointing to a construction date of circa 1735. It is among the oldest surviving houses in Virginia Beach. Situated on Adam Keeling Road in Great Neck Point on the Lynnhaven River, The Keeling House is known for decorative glazed headers and a center hall design, which is common in Tidewater Virginia British colonial architecture.

When built, the house was in rural Princess Anne County, but today the house sits in the middle of a suburban neighborhood. The house is privately owned, though it can be seen from the street. It is the oldest continuously occupied house in Virginia. A cemetery of family graves is north of the intersection of Adam Keeling Road and Lynn Cove Lane.

Through much of the 20th century, the house was known as Ye Dudlies. Other houses from the Virginia colony in Virginia Beach still extant include the Adam Thoroughgood House, Broad Bay Manor, Lynnhaven House, Pembroke Manor, Upper Wolfsnare, and Francis Land House.

Gallery

See also 
 History of Virginia Beach
 List of the oldest buildings in Virginia
 National Register of Historic Places listings in Virginia Beach, Virginia

References

External links
Adam Keeling House, Keeling Road, London Bridge, Virginia Beach, VA: 6 photos, 6 measured drawings, 3 data pages, and 1 photo caption page at Historic American Buildings Survey
 History
 Virginia Beach city picture

Historic American Buildings Survey in Virginia
Colonial architecture in Virginia
Houses completed in 1735
Houses in Virginia Beach, Virginia
Houses on the National Register of Historic Places in Virginia
National Register of Historic Places in Virginia Beach, Virginia